Article 10 of the European Convention on Human Rights provides the right to Freedom of Expression and Information. A fundamental aspect of this right is the freedom to hold opinions and receive and impart information and ideas, even if the receiver of such information does not share the same opinions or views as the provider.

Official Article Definition

Limitations to the Freedom of Expression 
Freedom of Expression is not an absolute right, meaning it is able to be interfered with by states and other public authority bodies.

However, each state is allowed a Margin of Appreciation. An acceptance of varying historical, legal, political, and cultural differences, which may lead the application of such freedom to be slightly varied in its nature despite the widespread adoption of the article. Such differences in the application have been allowed as long as the Freedom of Expression is as found in The Observer and The Guardian v United Kingdom (1991)."Narrowly interpreted and the necessity for any restrictions must be convincingly established" by national authorities.

Voorhoof and Gannie  suggest that for a state to legally interfere with a person's Freedom of Expression they need to pass the 'Triple Test' of conditions in Article 10 (2): such interferences have to be laid out in the nation's national law, be justified through the coverage of one of the objectives listed in the latter half of the section and lastly, necessary in a democratic society. Although by attempting to have a uniform application through the request of the 'Triple Test' and narrow interpretation of the article's content in individual national circumstances it has led some states through a belief the European court is being too stringent to neglect their duties and responsibilities of protection as required by the convention.

Importantly, the European Court of Human Rights (ECtHR) recognises the development and use of the internet to exercise this right and also the restrictions on it also being able to be justified by the same objectives.

Similarities and Differences to the US First Amendment 
Although widely accepted as a right within the European Convention, it is the First Amendment within the US constitution that is synonymous globally with the Freedom of Expression and Speech. Without closer inspection, it could be suggested that both are covering the same right just in differing contexts, however, this would not be an accurate assessment.

The structure of the freedoms in the US and the European Convention as revealed by Bleich are different from each other and arguably cover opposite things. "The US constitution categorically upholds the value of Free Speech whereas the European Court of Human Rights Article 10 explicitly lists the reasons that free expression can be constrained."

Similarly, Docherty suggests that institutionally, the US First Amendment is through the nature of the American Judicial system and the difficulty of constitutional reform affords greater protection as well as fewer restrictions on the Freedom of Speech. Whereas through the Margin of Appreciation and the reliance upon members' constitutions being sufficiently robust the Freedom of Expression within the ECtHR does not directly afford the same level of protection of expression to citizens.  

The main point of similarity the two sources of freedom of expression share is that they are both not absolute and can be limited, this is also enhanced through the varying criteria by which they can be restricted also being very similar. Namely, those listed in Article 10 (2) such as "…in the interests of national security, territorial integrity, or public safety, for the prevention of disorder or crime". It is this that often leads to a common belief they are one of the same by many of the population. Although it should be acknowledged as above that achieving such limitation is a point of difference between the two judicial systems and legislation.

Hate Speech 
Hate speech is highly contextual and subjective in terms of content and victim, which makes it very difficult to legislate against on a national and especially on a multinational level. As revealed by Foster, Article 10 is applicable to all forms of speech and expressions, but the ECtHR as highlighted by Handyside V United Kingdom demands a level of tolerance and pluralism of the exercise of the same freedom of expression right of others who share views which maybe not shared by the receiver of the information or opinions.

However, despite the expectancy of citizens to exercise tolerance, it may be difficult to achieve not only as stated before due to the subjective nature of offence being taken but also the complexity of the ECtHR failing to define hate speech within either Article 10 or any other convention, ruling or European wide statute to date. This could be explained through the need to provide states with a Margin of Appreciation, due to varying cultures finding offence to differing things. This was particularly evident when former Soviet Bloc countries in the East of central Europe adopted the ECHR.

It has been seen as an area of great debate that Article 10 and the wider ECtHR that by not having a definition of hate speech within its content that it could leave the fundamental concept of the Freedom of Expression and Free Speech to be abused by its users. But any limitations on the Freedom of Expression would damage a crucial right of those who live within a democracy, as some deem it to be counter what is laid out in Article 10 (2) as not being necessary in a democratic society.

The licensing exception 
The provision about "licensing of broadcasting, television or cinema enterprises", i.e. the state's right to license the
media companies, was included because of the limited number of available frequencies and the fact that, at that time, most European states had a monopoly of broadcasting and television. Later court decision held that due to "the technical progress in the last decades, the justification of these restrictions cannot be made by reference to the number of available frequencies and channels." The public monopolies within the audiovisual media were seen by the court as contrary to Article 10, primarily because they cannot provide a plurality of sources of information.

The court also held that devices for receiving broadcasting information, such as satellite dishes, do not fall under the restriction provided for in the last sentence of the first paragraph.

Connections to Different Articles (Articles 8, 9 and 11) 
It has been noted by a number of sources that when examining the ECHR articles those from Article 8 to Article 11 have a very comparable structure allowing for a similar examination by the ECtHR for when there has been a possible breach. In the same way as Article 10 similarly 8 (Right to respect for private and family life) 9 (Freedom of thought, conscience and religion), and 11 (Freedom of assembly and association) briefly describe the convention right and within the second section of the article describe the restrictions that can be used by a state or public authority body that can be imposed upon the right. Within the three articles, (8,9 and 11) the concept of expression can be to an extent found in each as an inherent characteristic.

Van Dijk et al. discuss how within Article 8 through the concept of private correspondence expression of an opinion can often take the form of the correspondence and so there needs to be adequate protection for the privacy of the correspondence and the expression within it from state interference. In a similar way, the freedom of thought, conscience, and religion in particular the latter is a form of self-expression. Consequently, Article 10 covers such expression too due to its wide scope. Lastly, expression is a vital aspect of Freedom of assembly and association as "Demonstration always constitutes an expression of opinion."

Case law
Handyside v United Kingdom (1976)
Lingens v Austria (1986) 8 EHRR 407
Mueller and Others v Switzerland (1988), application number 10737/84
The Observer and The Guardian v United Kingdom (1991) 14 EHRR 153, the "Spycatcher" case.
Otto-Preminger-Institut v Austria, see Liebeskonzil (1994)
Jersild v. Denmark (1994)
Bowman v United Kingdom [1998] ECHR 4, (1998) 26 EHRR 1
Appleby v United Kingdom (2003) 37 EHRR 38
Steel and Morris v United Kingdom (2005), the 'McLibel case'
Yildirim v Turkey (2012)
MGN Ltd v United Kingdom (2011) 39401/04, the Naomi Campbell success fee case
Delfi AS v. Estonia (2015)
Peruzzi v. Italy (2015)
E.S. v. Austria (2018)

See also
 Declaration of the Rights of Man and of the Citizen – Article XI states: "The free communication of thoughts and of opinions is one of the most precious rights of man: any citizen thus may speak, write, print freely, except to respond to the abuse of this liberty, in the cases determined by the law."
 First Amendment to the United States Constitution – government "shall make no law ... abridging the freedom of speech"
 Universal Declaration of Human Rights – Article 19 is nearly identical to Article 10 of the ECHR

Notes

External links

 
10